Rhinoceros is a genus comprising one-horned rhinoceroses. This scientific name was proposed by Swedish taxonomist Carl Linnaeus in 1758. The genus contains two species, the Indian rhinoceros (Rhinoceros unicornis) and the Javan rhinoceros (Rhinoceros sondaicus). Although both members are threatened, the Javan rhinoceros is one of the most endangered large mammals in the world with only 60 individuals surviving in Java (Indonesia). The word 'rhinoceros' is of Greek origin meaning "nose-horn".

Classification
The genus Rhinoceros comprises:
Indian rhinoceros (R. unicornis)   Indian subcontinent
Javan rhinoceros (R. sondaicus)  Southeast Asia
†R. sivalensis Falconer and Cautley, 1846 northern Indian subcontinent (Siwalik Hills) Pliocene-Early Pleistocene
†R. platyrhinus Falconer and Cautley 1847 syn Punjabitherium Khan (1971) Upper Siwaliks, Indian subcontinent, Early Pleistocene to early Middle Pleistocene, India. Largest species in the genus.
†R. sinensis Owen, 1870 Has been used as a wastebasket taxon used to refer to rhinoceros material from the Pleistocene of China, with various specimens belong to other Rhinoceros species, Dicerorhinus and Stephanorhinus, though it is possible that some remains attributed to Rhinoceros sinensis represents a valid and distinct species of Rhinoceros.
The species "Rhinoceros" philippinensis from the early Middle Pleistocene of the Philippines and "Rhinoceros" sinensis hayasakai from the Early-Middle Pleistocene of Taiwan have been transferred to Nesorhinus, which appears to be closely related to Rhinoceros. While Rhinoceros fusuiensis Yan et al. 2014 from the Early Pleistocene of South China has been transferred to Dicerorhinus.

Etymology 
The genus name Rhinoceros is a combination of the ancient Greek words ῥίς (ris) meaning 'nose' and κέρας (keras) meaning 'horn of an animal'.

References

External links 

Rhinoceroses
Mammal genera
Extant Miocene first appearances
Taxa named by Carl Linnaeus